Eugen Rex (8 July 1884 – 21 February 1943) was a German actor. Rex was a member of the Nazi Party.

Selected filmography

Bibliography
 Jung, Uli & Schatzberg, Walter. Beyond Caligari: The Films of Robert Wiene (1999), Berghahn Books,

References

External links

1884 births
1943 deaths
German male film actors
German male silent film actors
Male actors from Berlin
20th-century German male actors
Nazi Party members